Romance Without Finance Is a Nuisance is a studio album by American bluesman Gary B.B. Coleman. The album was released in 1991 by Ichiban Records label and contains eight compositions written by Coleman.

Reception
Alex Henderson of AllMusic stated "It was no coincidence that Gary Coleman had "BB" in his name. One of Coleman's main influences was B.B. King, and he was happy to acknowledge King's inspiration (although he's also learned a thing or two from Bobby "Blue" Bland, Jimmy Reed and the late Albert Collins). Romance Without Finance underscores the fact that while Coleman may not be the most original artist in the world, his Ichiban output has been consistent and enjoyable... Whether Coleman is being remorseful or humorous, this CD was a welcome addition to his catalogue.

Track listing

Personnel
Gary B.B. Coleman – vocals, guitar, keyboard, producing
John Cole – bass
Johnny Strong – drums

References

1991 albums
Gary B. B. Coleman albums
Ichiban Records albums